Gadeok Bridge is a bridge in Busan, South Korea. The bridge was completed in 2010. The bridge is part of Busan–Geoje Fixed Link.

References

Bridges completed in 2010
Bridges in Busan
Gangseo District, Busan